The Namibian Ministry of Labour (MOL) is a department of the Namibian government. It was established at Namibian independence in 1990. The first Namibian Minister of Labour and Manpower Development was Hendrik Witbooi. In 1995 the ministry was renamed Ministry of Labour and  Human Resources, the first minister with this portfolio was Moses ǁGaroëb. In 1997 the ministry was again renamed, to Ministry of Labour and Social Welfare. In 2015 the name of the ministry changed to Ministry of Labour, Industrial Relations and Employment Creation. Its  minister is Utoni Nujoma, son of Namibia's founding president Sam Nujoma.

Ministers
All labour ministers in chronological order are:

See also
Economy of Namibia

References

External links
Official website Ministry of Labour, Industrial Relations and Employment Creation

Labour
Labour
Economy of Namibia
1990 establishments in Namibia